Cryptostylis erecta, commonly known as the bonnet orchid or tartan tongue orchid , is an orchid endemic to south eastern Australia. A small and common plant, it has dark green lance-shaped to egg-shaped leaves and up to twelve greenish flowers with a large, bonnet-like or hood-like, lilac-coloured labellum with a network of purple veins.

Description
The leaves are dark green on the upper surface and purple below.
The base of the labellum is narrow and surrounds the column. Flowering occurs from September to April.

Taxonomy and naming
Cryptostylis erecta was first formally described in 1810 by Robert Brown and the description was published in Prodromus Florae Novae Hollandiae et Insulae Van Diemen. The specific epithet (erecta) is a Latin word meaning "upright".

Distribution and habitat
The natural habitat of C. erecta is on sandy soils, dry eucalyptus woodlands and heathlands. It occurs mostly in coastal districts, although it is also found in the Upper Blue Mountains.

Ecology
Like other Australian members of its genus, it is pollinated by the ichneumon wasp known as the orchid dupe wasp (Lissopimpla excelsa), the males of which mistake the flower parts for female wasps and copulate with it.

Use in horticulture
Cryptostylis erecta has been successfully grown by orchid enthusiasts, but is slow growing. The rhizomes are delicate and resent disturbance, and need to be moist at all times.

References 

erecta
Endemic orchids of Australia
Orchids of New South Wales
Orchids of Queensland
Orchids of Victoria (Australia)
Plants described in 1810
Taxa named by Robert Brown (botanist, born 1773)